Orval Tucker is an American former Negro league infielder who played in the 1930s.

Tucker attended Johnson C. Smith University, and played in the Negro leagues in 1930 for the Baltimore Black Sox and the Hilldale Club. In his 15 recorded career games, he posted 12 hits with a home run and nine RBI in 49 plate appearances.

References

External links
Baseball statistics and player information from Baseball-Reference Black Baseball Stats and Seamheads

Year of birth missing
Place of birth missing
Baltimore Black Sox players
Hilldale Club players